Gilmartin is a surname. Notable people with the surname include:

Charlotte Gilmartin (born 1990), English speed skater
Ian Gilmartin, British inventor
L. Gilmartin, 19th-century Scottish footballer
Mark Gilmartin (born 1963), American golf administrator
Mike Gilmartin (born 1986), American football player
Paul Gilmartin (born 1963), American comedian
Phil Gilmartin, British molecular biologist and botanist
Raymond Gilmartin (born 1941), American businessman
Rene Gilmartin (born 1987), Irish footballer
Sean Gilmartin (born 1990), American baseball player
Thomas Gilmartin (1861–1939), Irish Roman Catholic clergyman
Tom Gilmartin (disambiguation), multiple people